Bangaon is a village in Bakshi Ka Talab block of Lucknow district, Uttar Pradesh, India. As of 2011, its population is 730, in 151 households.

References 

Villages in Lucknow district